Fawkner railway station is located on the Upfield line in Victoria, Australia. It serves the northern Melbourne suburb of Hadfield, and it opened on 8 October 1889 as Fawkner. It closed on 13 July 1903, and reopened on 12 December 1906 as Fawkner Cemetery. It was renamed Fawkner in 1914.

History

Fawkner station originally opened on 8 October 1889, when the line from Coburg was extended to Somerton. Like the suburb itself, the station was named after John Pascoe Fawkner, one of the founders of Melbourne.

It is located adjacent to the Fawkner Crematorium and Memorial Park, which opened in 1906, and from then until 1939, special mortuary trains ran. From October 1914, only seven trains ran to Fawkner daily, as well as the daily mortuary train to the cemetery. A former mortuary van is located near the entrance to Platform 2.

From 1920, Fawkner was the extent of suburban electrified services. From 1928 until 1959, an AEC railmotor was used to provide a connecting service north to Somerton. In that year, electrified services were extended to Upfield.

Also in 1959, the line between Coburg and Fawkner was duplicated. However, the duplicated line converged at the Up end of the station, and until 1998, the station had one platform (present day Platform 2). The second track and Platform 1 were added as part of the duplication of the line between Fawkner and Gowrie.

Platforms and services

Fawkner has two side platforms. It is serviced by Metro Trains' Upfield line services.

Platform 1:
  all stations services to Flinders Street

Platform 2:
  all stations services to Upfield

Transport links

Broadmeadows Bus Service operates two routes via Fawkner station, under contract to Public Transport Victoria:
 : Campbellfield Plaza Shopping Centre – Coburg
 : Upfield station – North Coburg

References

External links
 
 Melway map at street-directory.com.au

Railway stations in Melbourne
Railway stations in Australia opened in 1889
Railway stations in the City of Merri-bek